Ó hÍceadha (in English: Hickey; O'Hickey) is a surname of Irish origin.

Naming conventions

History
The Ó hÍceadha surname is especially associated with the Kingdom of Thomond, where bearers of the name were in successive generations a medical family who were physicians to the clans of the Dál gCais, as well as other premier families of Munster and Leinster. Their home territory was Ballyhickey ("Baile Uí Ícidhe", or O Hickey's settlement), its neighbouring townland of Drim, and other townlands around Quin, County Clare. Prior to the 13th century they resided near Killaloe. By tradition, the O'Hickeys were reportedly known for brain surgery, especially the art of trepanning with silver plates the skulls fractures and other head injuries sustained in battle.

Doctors in the Hickey family were famous for their study of medicine and translated many Latin and Greek Medical textbooks over the centuries. In 1403, Nicholas Ó hÍceadha (with Boulger O'Callahan) wrote a commentary on the Aphorisms of Hippocrates, a fragment of which is still preserved in the British Museum, London. In 1489, Donnchad Óg Ó hÍceadha translated the works of contemporary European surgeons, an example being the work of Pietro d'Argeloto, the Chirurgia, into the Irish language. The British Museum holds two further medical works of 1589 by  Tomás Ó hÍceadha of Clare, and one by Domhnall Ó Troighthigh for the O'Hickeys. The Book of the O'Hickeys is located in the National Library of Ireland.

See also
 Hickey (surname)
 Irish medical families

Further reading
 O'Hickie of Kileton, Thomas Pierce, Shannonside Annual, 1957, pp. 65-69 
 A historical profile of the Hickey, O'Hickey family: the Dalcassians of Ireland. Cover Title: Hickey, O'Hickey (OhIcidhe), Irish Families Historical Society, New Jersey, c. 1993
 A little of Limerick, an account of the Hickey, Scanlan, and Baggott families of Camperdown and Cobden, J & S Walter, Australia (1999)
 Irish dusk colonial dawn: the Dooly, Hickey, O'Brien, O'Neill (Neale), O'Toole (Toole) & Ryan septs, Damian John Gleeson, Australia (1999)

References

External links
Hickey family pedigree at Library Ireland

Surnames
Irish families
Irish Brehon families
Surnames of Irish origin
Irish-language surnames
Families of Irish ancestry
History of County Clare
Irish medical families